is a passenger railway station located in then city of Nantan, Kyoto Prefecture, Japan, operated by West Japan Railway Company (JR West). It is a stop of limited express trains - "Kinosaki", "Hashidate" and "Maizuru".

Lines

Station layout
The station consists of two ground-level island platforms connected by an elevated station building. The station has a Midori no Madoguchi staffed ticket office.

Platforms

Adjacent stations

Bus routes

History
Sonobe Station opened on August 15, 1899. With the privatization of the Japan National Railways (JNR) on April 1, 1987, the station came under the aegis of the West Japan Railway Company. The current station building was completed in 1991.

Passenger statistics
In fiscal 2018, the station was used by an average of 4514 passengers daily (boarding  passengers only).

Surrounding area
 Kyoto College of Medical Science (formerly Kyoto College of Medical Science)
 Kyoto Arts and Crafts University (KYOBI)
 Kyoto School of Architecture (KASD)
 Kyoto Traditional Crafts College (TASK)

See also
List of railway stations in Japan

References

External links

JR Odekake.net 

Railway stations in Japan opened in 1899
Railway stations in Kyoto Prefecture
Sanin Main Line
Nantan, Kyoto